Events in the year 2009 in Bulgaria.

Incumbents 

 President: Georgi Parvanov
 Prime Minister: Sergei Stanishev (from 2005 until July 27) Boyko Borisov (from July 27 until 2013)

Events 

 10 January – Russia's gas dispute with Ukraine cuts supplies to Bulgaria, resulting in a severe energy shortage lasting several weeks and widespread anger at the government's energy policies.

References 

 
2000s in Bulgaria
Years of the 21st century in Bulgaria
Bulgaria
Bulgaria